Arthur Henry Reginald Buller,  (19 August 1874 – 3 July 1944) was a British-Canadian mycologist. He is mainly known as a researcher of fungi and wheat rust.

Academic career 

Born in Moseley, Birmingham, England, he was educated at Queen's College, Taunton. He then studied at Mason College, which later became the University of Birmingham, (B.Sc. in 1896), the University of Leipzig (Ph.D.), and the University of Munich. He was awarded a D.Sc. by the University of Birmingham. He  worked briefly for the Naples Zoological Station. From 1901 to 1904, he was a lecturer in Botany at the University of Birmingham. He came to Canada in 1904, founded the Botany Department and was the first Professor of Botany and Geology at the University of Manitoba, and served as Head of the Botany Department until his retirement in 1936.

His book Essays on Wheat (Macmillan, 1919) deals with the early history of wheat-growing in Manitoba, wheat-growing in western Canada, the discovery and introduction of Marquis wheat, the origin of the wheat varieties Red Bobs and Kitchener, and Palestine's wild wheat. He wrote a 7-volume series Researches on Fungi published in 6 volumes from 1909 to 1934 with the 7th volume published posthumously in 1950.

Poetry 
He also wrote limericks, some of which were published in Punch, including this one on Einstein's special theory of relativity:

Honours 
He was elected a Fellow of the Royal Society of Canada (FRSC) in 1909, and became its President in 1927. He was the President of the British Mycological Society in 1914. In 1929, he was awarded the Royal Society of Canada's Flavelle Medal. In 1937, he was elected a Fellow of the Royal Society (FRS). He was a life member of the Mycological Society of America.

He was awarded honorary degrees from the University of Saskatchewan, University of Calcutta, University of Manitoba, and University of Pennsylvania. The Buller Building at the University of Manitoba, built in 1932, is named in his honour.

References 

Goldsborough, Gordon. Reginald Buller: The Poet-Scientist of Mushroom City. Manitoba History Number 47, Spring/Summer 2004

External links 

 
 
 

1874 births
1944 deaths
People from Moseley
British mycologists
20th-century British botanists
20th-century Canadian botanists
Canadian mycologists
Fellows of the Royal Society of Canada
Fellows of the Royal Society
English emigrants to Canada
Royal Medal winners
Academic staff of the University of Manitoba
People educated at Queen's College, Taunton
Alumni of the University of Birmingham
Academics of the University of Birmingham
Canadian Fellows of the Royal Society
Presidents of the British Mycological Society